Palazzo Santucci (Italian for Santucci Palace)  is a  Renaissance fortified palace in Navelli, Province of L'Aquila (Abruzzo).

References

External links

Navelli
Santucci
Renaissance architecture in Abruzzo